Yangpingguan railway station is a railway station in Yangpingguan, Ningqiang County, Hanzhong, Shaanxi, China. It opened in 1956. It is an intermediate stop on the Baoji–Chengdu railway and the western terminus of the Yangpingguan–Ankang railway.

References 

Railway stations in Shaanxi
Railway stations in China opened in 1956